Kate Courtney may refer to:

 Kate Courtney (cyclist) (born 1995), American cyclist
 Catherine Courtney, Baroness Courtney of Penwith (1847–1929), British social worker and internationalist